Fenggui Cave is a cave in Magong City, Penghu County, Taiwan.

Name
The name Fenggui means a kind of wind cabinet of Chinese organ.

Geology
The cave was formed by the continuous sea waves erosion on to its coastal areas. It features a two-story shell-shaped pavilion nearby.

See also
 Geology of Taiwan

References

Caves of Taiwan
Landforms of Penghu County